Li Chenguang (Chinese: 李晨光, born 12 January 1990 in Dandong) is a Chinese football player who currently plays for Zibo Cuju in the China League One.

Club career
Li started his professional football career in 2008 when he was loaned to China League Two club Shaanxi Star, which is made up of Shaanxi Baorong Chanba's youth team players, for one year. Li was promoted to Shaanxi Baorong Chanba's first team squad by Zhu Guanghu in 2010.  On 23 May 2010, he made his debut for Shaanxi Baorong Chanba in the 2010 Chinese Super League against Qingdao Jonoon, coming on as a substitute for Xin Feng in the 33rd minute. In March 2012, Li transferred to China League Two side Hubei China-Kyle .
On 1 March 2014, Li transferred to China League One side Qingdao Jonoon.

On 19 February 2016, Li transferred to fellow China League One side Nei Mongol Zhongyou. On 27 February 2017, Li was loaned to China League Two club Shaanxi Chang'an Athletic.

Career statistics
Statistics accurate as of match played 31 December 2020.

References

External links
 

1990 births
Living people
Chinese footballers
Footballers from Liaoning
People from Dandong
Beijing Renhe F.C. players
Xinjiang Tianshan Leopard F.C. players
Qingdao Hainiu F.C. (1990) players
Inner Mongolia Zhongyou F.C. players
Shaanxi Chang'an Athletic F.C. players
Chinese Super League players
China League One players
China League Two players
Association football defenders